Samuel Scott Marshall (March 12, 1821 – July 26, 1890) was a U.S. Representative from Illinois.

Early life and education
Born near Shawneetown, Illinois, Marshall attended public and private schools in McLeansboro, Illinois, and Cumberland College, Kentucky.

Marshall studied law.

Legal career
Marshall was admitted to the bar in 1845 and commenced practice in McLeansboro, Illinois.

State political career
Marshall served as member of the Illinois House of Representatives in 1846 and 1847.
He then served as State's attorney for the third judicial circuit of Illinois in 1847 and 1848.

First judgeship (1851–1854)
Marshall served as an Illinois circuit court judge from 1851 until 1854.

First tenure in the United States House of Representatives (1855–1859)
Marshall was elected as a Democrat to the Thirty-fourth and Thirty-fifth Congresses (serving March 4, 1855 – March 4, 1859). He served as chairman of the Committee on Claims during the 35th United States Congress.

1861 United States Senate candidacy

He was the candidate of his party for United States Senator in 1861. He lost to incumbent Republican Lyman Trumbull, with Trumbull receiving 54 votes in the Illinois House of Representatives to Marshall's 46 votes on January 9, 1861.

He also served as delegate to the Democratic National Convention of 1860.

Second judgeship (1861–1864)
Marshall again served as an Illinois Circuit Court judge from 1861 until 1864.

Marshall served as a delegate to the 1864 Democratic National Convention

Second tenure in the United States House of Representatives (1865–1875)
Marshall was elected to the 39th United States Congress and to the four following Congresses (serving March 4, 1865 – March 4, 1875), and was the candidate of his party for Speaker of the House in 1867. He represented Illinois's 11th congressional district for four terms and Illinois's 19th congressional district for his final term.

Marshall served as delegate to the 1866 National Union Convention.

During the 40th United States Congress, Marshall served on the House Committee on the Judiciary, which was conducting the first impeachment inquiry against President Andrew Johnson. On November 25, 1867, the committee voted 5–4 to recommend impeachment.  Hinds was on the minority side opposing impeachment, along with the one other Democrat on the committee and two Republicans. On December 7, 1867, Marshall was joined by 108 other congressmen (including 66 members of the Republican Party in a full House vote which defeated the resolution put forward to impeach Johnson by 57–108.

On January 28, 1868, Marshall voted against a resolution launching the second impeachment inquiry against Johnson, but the resolution passed 99–31. On December 7, 1867, Marshall voted against the impeachment of Andrew Johnson, which the house passed 126–47. On March 2 and 3, 1968, Marshall voted against all eleven articles of impeachment. When it came time, on March 2, 1868, to vote on who to appoint as the House's impeachment managers (those House members that would prosecutors during the trial), Speaker Shuyler Colfax initially appointed Marshall to act as a teller to tally the vote. However, Marshall requested to be excused from this role, and he, along with the rest of the Democrats, ultimately abstained from voting on impeachment managers.

Marshall was an unsuccessful candidate for reelection in 1874 to the 44th United States Congress.

Later career
Marshall served as a delegate to the 1880 Democratic National Convention.

Marshall served as president of the board of managers of Hamilton College from 1875 through 1880.

Death
He died in McLeansboro, Illinois on July 26, 1890. He was interred in Odd Fellows Cemetery.

References

1821 births
1890 deaths
People from Shawneetown, Illinois
Illinois state court judges
Democratic Party members of the Illinois House of Representatives
Democratic Party members of the United States House of Representatives from Illinois
19th-century American politicians
19th-century American judges